"Hey! Jealous Lover" is a song written by Sammy Cahn, Bee Walker, and Kay Twomey and performed by Frank Sinatra featuring Nelson Riddle and His Orchestra. It reached #3 on the U.S. pop chart in 1956.

Other versions
Lita Roza released a version of the song on her 1956 EP Lita Roza.
Mickey Katz and His Orchestra released a version of the song as the B-side to his 1957 single "Barmitzvah Special".
Tex Beneke and His Orchestra released a version of the song on his 1957 EP Today's Hits.
George Maharis released a version of the song on his 1964 album Tonight You Belong to Me.
Earl Grant released a version of the song on his 1965 album Spotlight on Earl Grant.
Count Basie released a version of the song on his 1989 compilation album Count Basie/The Standards.

References

1956 songs
1956 singles
Songs with lyrics by Sammy Cahn
Songs with lyrics by Kay Twomey
Frank Sinatra songs
Capitol Records singles